The Rivière Capot is a river of Martinique. It flows into the Caribbean Sea near Basse-Pointe.

See also
List of rivers of Martinique

References

Rivers of Martinique
Rivers of France